Sławomir Zawiślak (born 9 June 1963) is a Polish politician.

Zawiślak was born in Krasnobród.  He was elected to the Sejm on 25 September 2005, getting 5,860 votes in 7 Chełm district as a candidate from the Law and Justice list. He was elected again on 21 October 2007, getting 16,064 votes.

See also
Members of Polish Sejm 2005-2007
Members of Polish Sejm 2007-2011

External links
Official website
Sławomir Zawiślak - parliamentary page - includes declarations of interest, voting record, and transcripts of speeches.

1963 births
Living people
People from Zamość County
Members of the Polish Sejm 2005–2007
Members of the Polish Sejm 2007–2011
Members of the Polish Sejm 2011–2015
Members of the Polish Sejm 2015–2019
Members of the Polish Sejm 2019–2023
Law and Justice politicians